Talita Werneck Arguelhes (born 11 August 1983), known professionally as Tatá Werneck, is a Brazilian actress, television presenter, comedian, musician, and former VJ.

Career 

She began her acting studies at the age of 9 and subsequently appeared in her first theatrical performance at 11. Her debut in a televised program occurred in 2008, when she joined the cast of Dilemas de Irene. Two years later, she joined the team of Quinta Categoria, formerly MTV Brasil, and participated in several other station's programs between 2010 and 2012.

Werneck only found nationwide fame in 2013, after landing the role of a comedic hoochie Valdirene who longed to marry a rich man in the soap opera Amor à Vida, broadcast by Rede Globo, Brazil’s main television station. Its performance achieved huge success and consecrated it as the revelation of the year almost unanimously in the press. Since then, the comedian starred in programs on Multishow, including the successful Vai Que Cola and the comedy Tudo pela Audiência, which she co-host with the comedian Fábio Porchat. Werneck featured in the soap opera I Love Paraisópolis, starring opposite model and actress Bruna Marquezine. Currently, Werneck plays Fedora Abdalla in Haja Coração.

In terms of performance, Werneck stands out for her skillful improvisation and is considered one of the most well known comedic performers in Brazil. In 2010, the actress was voted the funniest comedian in the country by readers of website Universo Online. In 2013, she received the nickname "Queen of Improvisation" by iG and in 2014, she won the title of "Best Breakthrough" in a poll conducted by Folha de S.Paulo with Rede Globo viewers. In addition, she was named "Woman of the Year" by the Brazilian edition of men's magazine GQ and became the first comedian to star in a cosmetic advert when appearing for L'Oréal. In May 2016, magazine Capricho named her the "Queen of Comedy".

Besides acting, Werneck is the lead singer of a musical group called "Renatinho", since 2012, and actively participates in animal protection and welfare campaigns, as well as the inclusion of disabled participants in theatre. She was one of the founders of the first theatre group to produce affordable pieces to disabled people, called Os Inclusos e os Sisos – Mobilisation Theatre for Diversity.

Professional life

Early career
In 2004 Werneck started, with her university classmates, a theatre group called "Os Inclusos e os sisos"- Theatre Mobilisation for Diversity, which was the first Brazilian group to create a totally accessible play for disabled people.

MTV and national recognition

Werneck was also a comedian on MTV, where she began to build experience. Apart from that, Werneck acted in some cinematic productions, such as the film "Teste de Elenco".

In February 2013, Werneck eventually signed her first contract with Rede Globo to act in a soap opera.

Filmography

Awards and nominations

References

External links

1983 births
Living people
Actresses from Rio de Janeiro (city)
Brazilian television actresses
Brazilian film actresses
Brazilian women musicians
Brazilian television presenters
21st-century women musicians
Brazilian women television presenters